The Ödseen (bleak lakes) are two small mountain lakes (Großer Ödsee  and Kleiner Ödsee ) in Upper Austria's part of the Salzkammergut.

References 

Lakes of Upper Austria